La Falange, also known as FE/La Falange, is a Spanish political party registered in 1999. The party originated as a split of the Falange Española de las JONS, led by Gustavo Morales and Jesús López. Ideologically the party claims to be a successor of the original Falange Española of the 1930s, and follower of the ideas of José Antonio Primo de Rivera, Ramiro Ledesma Ramos, Onésimo Redondo and Julio Ruiz de Alda.

History 
FE/La Falange was founded in 1999 after a split in FE-JONS, that was the result of an internal conflict between the faction of Diego Márquez Horrillo and the faction of Gustavo Morales. Finally, the first one won and the sector that supported Morales left FE-JONS. In the local elections of 1999 the party gained three town councillors. Since 2000-2001 the party adopted more xenophobic positions, in contrast to traditional falangism. Due to this ideological changes, a sector known as Falange Auténtica split in 2002.

In 2005 the party split into two factions: one led by José Fernando Cantalapiedra, known as the National Front, and other led by Manuel Andrino, that was called Frente Español. From 2005 to 2009, both factions will be participate in the elections with those brands, leaving the brand La Falange virtually dead. Finally, in 2009, the court ruled in favor of the Andrino faction, which started using again the original name.

Since 2013 the organization is part of the political movement and election coalition La España en Marcha (LEM), inspired by the success of Golden Dawn in Greece.

The organization is extremely hostile to Basque and Catalan independentism. In 2013 members of the organization participated in an assault in Madrid against a Catalan cultural centre during the celebrations of the National Day of Catalonia, and it has also participated in unionist demonstrations and burned estelades (Catlan independentist flags).

Electorally the party only has (and has had) elected representatives at the local level. Currently the party has 2 town councillors elected in the lists of the Independent Party of Becerril de la Sierra. This party is actually a coalition between FE/La Falange, National Democracy and local independents.

Electoral Performance

Cortes Generales

European Parliament

See also 

 FET-JONS
 Falange Española
 JONS

External links 
 Website of FE/La Falange
 Youth of La Falange
 Official twitter

Notes 

1979 establishments in Spain
Falangist parties
Fascist parties in Spain
Political parties established in 1979
Republican parties in Spain
Spanish nationalism